World Hum is an online travel magazine. Founded in 2001 by Jim Benning and Michael Yessis, Worldhum.com was acquired in May 2007, by Travel Channel

World Hum features a Travel Blog, How To's, Book Reviews, Q&A, and travel dispatches.  The focus of the online magazine is to focus not on the destinations, but on travel in the general sense of the word.

References

External links 
 Travelchannel.com official website.
 World Hum website.
 An interview with Jim Benning on Notebook on Cities and Culture

American travel websites